Álvaro Gonçalves da Maia (c.1370–1449) was a Portuguese nobleman, member of the Court of John I of Portugal. He served as Ambassador in Aragon. 

His parents were Martim da Maia and Ana Afonso de Lanços, daughter of Florência Antónia de Lanços and Richard of Teyve, grandson of Richard, 1st Earl of Cornwall.

References

External links 
digitarq.dgarq.gov.pt

1380 births
1449 deaths
14th-century Portuguese people
15th-century Portuguese people
Portuguese nobility